Krymsk is a town in Krasnodar Krai, Russia. Population: 57,927 (2020),

History
It was founded in 1858 as the fortress and stanitsa of Krymskaya, named after the Crimean Cossack Regiment. It was the capital of the Greek Autonomous District, which existed between 1930 and 1938. The stanitsa was granted town status and given its present name a century later, in 1958. The town's railway station, however, retains the name Krymskaya.

2012 floods

Krasnodar Krai experienced a flash flood on July 7, 2012, after heavy rains. About  of rain fell over the region. State television reported that it was an equivalent of three-to-four months' worth of rainfall in a typical year. In the hilly area, water formed torrents that rushed into towns.

One of the worst known calamities in modern times in this region, the flood killed more than 150 people; 140 of the deaths occurred in Krymsk. Subsequently the Russian government declared a day of mourning on July 9, 2012.

The Russian government has acknowledged that town authorities were aware of the rising waters at 10 pm on Friday night, but failed to notify the residents of Krymsk of the approaching flood. Russian officials admitted this failure was a major error.

Administrative and municipal status
Within the framework of administrative divisions, Krymsk serves as the administrative center of Krymsky District, even though it is not a part of it. As an administrative division, it is incorporated separately as the Town of Krymsk—an administrative unit with the status equal to that of the districts. As a municipal division, the Town of Krymsk, together with the khutor of Verkhneadagum in Nizhnebakansky Rural Okrug of Krymsky District, is incorporated within Krymsky Municipal District as Krymskoye Urban Settlement.

Climate
Krymsk has a humid subtropical climate (Köppen climate classification Cfa).

Military
The main fighter regiment at the base has gone through a series of re-organizations and re-designations:
January 9, 2001: absorbed the 562nd Fighter Aviation Regiment, and renamed 3rd Guards Fighter Aviation Regiment.
January 12, 2009 renamed 6972nd Guards Aviation Base.

The base is now part of the 4th Air and Air Defence Forces Command.

Plant breeding
Krymsk is known for its experimental plant-breeding station, which holds important scientific collections of, among other crops, green peas, sweetcorn, tomatoes, peppers, aubergines (eggplants), cucumbers, apples, plums, peaches, pears, apricots, strawberries, and melon. The station's stone fruit and quince collections are the largest and most important in Russia or any part of the former Soviet Union. Of the 9,000 accessions of Prunus, about 5,000 to 6,000 are wild species and forms, 500 to 1,000 local varieties, and 2,000 to 3,000 cultivars and breeding materials. The station is also known for the creation of fruit-tree rootstocks, which are named after the town + a number (e.g. Krymsk 1, Krymsk 2, etc.)

References

Notes

Sources

Cities and towns in Krasnodar Krai
Populated places established in 1858
1858 establishments in the Russian Empire